Désirée Le Beau (14 February 1907 - 1993) was an Austro-Hungarian-American industrial chemist and inventor known for developing new methods of rubber reclamation.

Early life and education 
Le Beau was born in Teschen, Austria-Hungary, now in modern-day Poland. Le Beau studied at the University of Vienna for her undergraduate degree, and earned her Ph.D. in chemistry with minors in physics and mathematics from the University of Graz in 1931. In 1955, she married Henry W. Meyer.

Career and research 
After earning her Ph.D., Le Beau started her career as a researcher at the Austro-American Rubber Works in Vienna. She was also a consultant for the Société de Progrès Technique in Paris. In 1936, she moved to the Dewey and Alma Chemical Company in Massachusetts, where she stayed until her 1940 move to MIT as a research associate. Le Beau stayed at MIT until 1945, then moved to Illinois to work in rubber reclaiming, where she stayed until 1950. In 1950, she moved to Pennsylvania and became the Currie lecturer at Pennsylvania State College.

Le Beau was noted for her work with colloids and her use of tires in both natural and synthetic rubber reclamation; she also worked on the structure of clay and rubber, both natural and synthetic. She held several patents in this area.

References 

American women scientists
20th-century American chemists
1907 births
1993 deaths
University of Vienna alumni
University of Graz alumni
Massachusetts Institute of Technology staff
Austrian emigrants to the United States
20th-century American women scientists